Dvinskoy is a rural locality (a settlement) and the administrative center of Dvinskoye Rural Settlement of Verkhnetoyemsky District, Arkhangelsk Oblast, Russia. The population was 2,543 as of 2010. There are 15 streets.

Geography 
Dvinskoy is located on the Severnaya Dvina River, 12 km southeast of Verkhnyaya Toyma (the district's administrative centre) by road. Goncharovskaya is the nearest rural locality.

References 

Rural localities in Verkhnetoyemsky District